Rougon is a rural commune in the Alpes-de-Haute-Provence department in the Provence-Alpes-Côte d'Azur region in Southeastern France. In 2019, it had a population of 121.

Demographics

See also
Communes of the Alpes-de-Haute-Provence department

References

Communes of Alpes-de-Haute-Provence
Alpes-de-Haute-Provence communes articles needing translation from French Wikipedia